The stress–strain index (SSI), of a bone, is a surrogate measure of bone strength determined from a cross-sectional scan by QCT or pQCT (radiological scan). The stress–strain index is used to compare the structural parameters determined by analysis of QCT/pQCT cross-sectional scans to the results of three-point bending test.


Definition
It is calculated using the following formula:

Where:
 rmax is the distance of voxel from centre
 CD is the apparent cortical (bone) density
 ND is the normal (cortical bone) density
 ri is the pixel position from the centre
 a is the area of a pixel

History and relation to moments of inertia
It was developed by the manufacturer of a peripheral quantitative CT (pQCT) scanner, and is considered to be by some an improvement over the information provided by calculating the area moments of inertia and polar moments of inertia.

References

Orthopedic surgical procedures